"Lucid Dreams" is a song by Scottish indie rock band Franz Ferdinand. It was originally released as a digital download single on 19 August 2008. An extended and reworked version later appeared on their third studio album, Tonight: Franz Ferdinand (2009). The song peaked at number 35 on the Canadian Hot 100.

Single version
Originally only listenable through a static-covered stream on the band's website and the video game Madden NFL 09, it was released as a single through iTunes on 19 August 2008 (despite an earlier message on the band's diary having stated "it's not a single"). This version is available as an iTunes bonus track to the album and also as a B-side to "No You Girls" in a slightly different mix.

Album version
The single differs from the version that appears on Tonight: Franz Ferdinand, which has been described by several reviewers as the highlight of the album. The pre-album bridge now starts the song, the chorus has been revised and the original second verse and ending are omitted. The song crossfades into a three-minute acid techno instrumental piece with about three minutes left in the song (this is used as the song's outro).

Track listing 
Digital download

Charts

References

2008 singles
Franz Ferdinand (band) songs
Songs written by Alex Kapranos
Songs written by Nick McCarthy
2008 songs
Domino Recording Company singles